The Yellow Claw is a 1921 British silent crime film directed by René Plaissetty and starring Sydney Seaward, Arthur M. Cullin and Harvey Braban. The film was shot partly at Cricklewood Studios and ran 68 minutes. It was based on the 1915 novel The Yellow Claw by Sax Rohmer, in which a French detective battles a notorious master criminal named Mr. King.

Plot
A frightened woman is murdered in the London apartment of a well-known novelist named Henry Leroux. The police arrest Leroux's butler, but he escapes and runs off to a mysterious opium den, the lair of a drug dealer named Mister King. Gaston Max, a detective from Paris, arrives in London to investigate the drug trafficking. Although the police take down the gang, Mr. King escapes and manages to keep his true identity a secret.

Cast
 Sydney Seaward as Inspector Dunbar 
 Arthur M. Cullin as Dr. Cumberley 
 Harvey Braban as Gaston Max 
 Annie Esmond as Denise Ryland 
 Norman Page as Soames 
 Kitty Fielder as Lady of the Poppies 
 Kiyoshi Takase as Ho-Pin 
 A.C. Fotheringham-Lysons as Henry Leroux 
 Mary Massart as Helen Cumberley 
 Cyril Percival as John Howard Edel 
 Ivy King as Mrs. Leroux 
 June Tripp as Mrs. Vernon 
 Eric Albury as Gianopolis 
 Geoffrey Benstead as Sowerby

Other Stoll Pictures productions on the same theme 
Producer Stoll went on to release another xenophobic Yellow Peril film called Mr. Wu in 1919 (which was remade in 1927 with Lon Chaney in the lead), a 15-film Fu Manchu series called The Mystery of Dr. Fu Manchu in 1923, and an eight-film series in 1924 called The Further Mysteries of Dr. Fu Manchu, both series starring Harry Agar Lyons as Fu.

References

Sources

</ref>

External links

1921 films
1921 crime films
British crime films
British silent feature films
Films directed by René Plaissetty
Films based on British novels
Films shot at Cricklewood Studios
British black-and-white films
1920s police procedural films
1920s English-language films
1920s British films